Jan Willems is a Dutch language name. It may refer to:

Jan Willems (fl 15201547/1548), a Flemish painter
Jan Willems (died 1688), a Dutch buccaneer